Other Voices, Other Rooms (stylized as Other Voices | Other Rooms) is the tenth studio album by American singer Nanci Griffith. It was released on March 2, 1993 by Elektra Records. Her first since leaving MCA Records, it consisted entirely of cover songs, in tribute to songwriters who influenced her own songwriting. Guest artists who appear in their own compositions included Frank Christian playing guitar on "Three Flights Up", Bob Dylan playing harmonica on "Boots of Spanish Leather", and John Prine lending harmony vocals on "Speed of the Sound of Loneliness". The album was titled after the Truman Capote novel of the same name.

The album rose to the  position on the Billboard Pop Albums chart in 1993, although it had no charting singles. The album concept was inspired by the 1990 album True Voices, which was also made up of cover songs including one that Griffith recorded on Other Voices, Other Rooms – "Across The Great Divide", written by Kate Wolf. Other Voices, Other Rooms was certified gold by the RIAA on January 30, 2005, signifying shipments of 500,000 units in the United States.

In 1998, Griffith released a sequel album titled Other Voices, Too (A Trip Back to Bountiful).

Track listing

Awards and recognition
Griffith won the 1994 Grammy Award for Best Contemporary Folk Album, and producer Jim Rooney won a Grammy Award for production.

Personnel
Nanci Griffith – lead vocal (except 17), guitar, harmony vocals (throughout)
Pete Kennedy – lead acoustic guitar (throughout)
Stuart Duncan – mandolin, violin (throughout)
Pat McInerney – percussion (throughout)
Fran Breen – drums, percussion (throughout)
Chet Atkins – guitar (15, 16)
John Catchings – cello (2, 16)
Frank Christian – guitar (2-5, 13)
Guy Clark – guitar, vocals (9)
Pete Cummins – harmony vocals, guitar (7)
Iris DeMent – vocals, harmony vocals, guitar (12, 15)
Philip Donnelly – guitar (6-8, 10)
Bob Dylan – harmonica (5)
Béla Fleck – banjo (10)
Pat Flynn – guitar (9, 12)
Arlo Guthrie – harmony vocals, guitar (3)
Emmylou Harris – harmony vocals, guitar (1, 15)
John Hartford – banjo, vocals (17)
Carolyn Hester – harmony vocals (8)
James Hooker – harmony vocal, organ, piano, keyboards
Roy M. "Junior" Husky – bass (9, 17)
Lee Satterfield – guitar, harmony vocals (2, 11)
Mary Ann Kennedy – percussion, vocals (17)
Leo Kottke – guitar (17)
Alison Krauss – violin (2)
Edgar Meyer – bass (2)
Odetta – lead vocal (17)
David Mallett, John Gorka, Marlin Griffith, Amy Ray, Emily Saliers, Pamela Rose, Holly Tashian, Barry Tashian, Jim Rooney – vocals (17)
Don Edwards – yodeling (14)
John Prine – vocals, harmony vocals (6, 17)
Andrea Zonn – viola (2)

References

1993 albums
Covers albums
Grammy Award for Best Contemporary Folk Album
Nanci Griffith albums
Elektra Records albums